Anomala linwenhsini is a species of beetle in the family Scarabaeidae. It was described by Ming-Zhi Zhao and Carsten Zorn in 2022.

Etymology 
The species is named after Wen-Hsin Lin, who collected the type specimen.

Distribution 
This species can be found in Taiwan.

References 

Rutelinae
Beetles described in 2022